Oe or OE may refer to:

Language, linguistics, phonics and writing
Old English, the English language spoken in the Early Middle Ages
Œ or œ, a ligature of o and e used in the modern French and medieval Latin alphabets
Oe (digraph)
Open front rounded vowel or 
Open-mid front rounded vowel or 
Ö, a character sometimes representing 'oe', appearing in some Germanic, Turkic, and Uralic languages
Ø, a Northern European (Danish, Faroese, Norwegian) or Sami vowel, representing œ, 'oe' diphthong etc.
Ө, a letter in the Cyrillic alphabet

Places
Oe, Estonia, a village of Estonia
Ōe, Yamagata, a town of Japan
Oe District, Tokushima, a former district of Japan
Ōe, Kyoto, a former town of Japan
Oe (Attica), a town of ancient Attica, Greece
Oe, a shortcut for the Czech city Otrokovice
Olathe East High School, a high school in Olathe, Kansas, US

People
Ōe (surname), a Japanese surname
Kenzaburō Ōe, a major Japanese writer
Old Edwardian (OE), a former pupil of various schools named after a King Edward or St. Edward
Old Etonian (OE), a former pupil of Eton College, England

Groups and organizations
  (OE), a Portuguese order of engineers
Order of Excellence of Guyana, the highest honour of Guyana
Okean Elzy, a Ukrainian rock band

Science and technology
°Oe, a measurement on the Oechsle scale for the density of grape must
Oersted (Oe), a unit of magnetic field strength
On30 or Oe, a model railway gauge
OpenEmbedded (OE), a Linux-based embedded build system
Opportunistic encryption (OE), a means to combat passive wiretapping
Outlook Express, a former email program of Microsoft
Ophryocystis elektroscirrha, a parasite of monarch and queen butterflies

Other uses
Odakyū Enoshima Line
OE, the aircraft registration prefix for Austrian aircraft
Overseas experience (OE), a New Zealand term for extended working holidays
Overview effect, the cognitive shift experienced by astronauts when viewing Earth from space

See also

0e (disambiguation), listing uses with the number nought
OES (disambiguation)